Lagopus is a small genus of birds in the grouse subfamily commonly known as ptarmigans. The genus contains three living species with numerous described subspecies, all living in tundra or cold upland areas.

Taxonomy and etymology
The genus Lagopus was introduced by the French zoologist Mathurin Jacques Brisson in 1760 with the willow ptarmigan (Lagopus lagopus) as the type species. The genus name Lagopus is derived from Ancient Greek , meaning "hare, rabbit", + , "foot", in reference to the feathered feet and toes typical of this cold-adapted group (such as the snowshoe hare). The specific epithets muta and leucura were for a long time misspelt mutus and leucurus, in the erroneous belief that the ending of Lagopus denotes masculine gender. However, as the Ancient Greek term  is of feminine gender, and the specific epithet has to agree with that, the feminine muta and leucura are correct.

The English name ptarmigan comes from the Scottish Gaelic name for the bird,  ([]), meaning “croaker”, which refers to the bird’s frog-like call. The p- was added due to a mistaken belief in a Greek origin, as if the word were related to the Greek word  (pterón), 'wing'.

Description

The three species are all sedentary specialists of cold regions. Willow ptarmigan is a circumpolar boreal forest species, white-tailed ptarmigan is a North American alpine bird, and rock ptarmigan breeds in both Arctic and mountain habitats across Eurasia and North America. With the exception of the red grouse (a subspecies of willow ptarmigan), all have a white winter plumage that helps them blend into the snowy background. Even their remiges are white, while these feathers are black in almost all birds (even birds that are predominantly white, such as the Bali myna) because melanin makes them more resilient and thus improves flight performance. The Lagopus grouse apparently found it easier to escape predators by not being seen than by flying away.

These are hardy vegetarian birds, but insects are also taken by the developing young. In all species except for the willow ptarmigan, the female takes all responsibility for nesting and caring for the chicks, as is typical with gamebirds.

Species

The genus contains three species:

Fossil record
Two prehistoric species and two paleosubspecies are only known from fossils:

 Lagopus atavus (Early Pliocene of Bulgaria? - Late Pliocene)
 Lagopus balcanicus (Late Pliocene of Varshets, Bulgaria)
 Lagopus lagopus noaillensis (Pleistocene of W Europe)
 Lagopus mutus correzensis (Pleistocene of W Europe)

References

 Madge, Steve; McGowan, Philip J. K. & Kirwan, Guy M. (2002): Pheasants, partidges and grouse: a guide to the pheasants, partridges, quails, grouse, guineafowl, buttonquails and sandgrouse of the world. Christopher Helm, London. .

External links 
 

 
Bird genera
Provincial symbols of Newfoundland and Labrador